The Horn's Full is an album by saxophonist Jack Montrose's Quintet with Red Norvo recorded in 1957 for the RCA Victor label.

Reception

AllMusic rated the album with 3 stars; in his review Scott Yanow states: "The music is greatly uplifted by Montrose's inventive arrangements and has many concise solos. Despite the quality, Montrose would not have his next opportunity to lead a record date for 28 years".

Track listing
All compositions by Jack Montrose except as indicated
 "Rosanne" (Edna Osser, Glenn Osser) - 3:14 	
 "Polka Dots and Moonbeams" (Jimmy Van Heusen, Johnny Burke) - 5:03
 "The Little House" - 3:01	
 "Dark Angel" - 5:07
 "Solid Citizen" - 3:24
 "Goody Goody" (Matty Malneck, Johnny Mercer) - 2:46
 "Do Nothing till You Hear from Me" (Duke Ellington, Bob Russell) - 2:56 	
 "True Blue" - 3:28
 "The Horn's Full" - 2:42	
 "Crazy She Calls Me" (Carl Sigman, Russell) - 5:46
 "Headline" - 3:15

Personnel 
Jack Montrose - tenor saxophone, arranger
Red Norvo - vibraphone
Jim Hall - guitar (tracks 4, 10, 11); Barney Kessel - guitar (tracks 1–3, 5–9)
Max Bennett - bass (tracks 4, 10, 11); Red Wootten - bass (tracks 1–3, 5–9)
 Bill Dolney - drums (tracks 4, 10, 11); Mel Lewis - drums (tracks 1–3, 5–9)

References 

1958 albums
RCA Records albums
Jack Montrose albums
Red Norvo albums